Charles Norris may refer to:

 Charles Gilman Norris (1881–1945),American novelist
 Charles Norris (etcher) (1779–1858), English topographical etcher and writer
 Charles Norris (medical examiner) (1867–1935), American pioneer of forensic toxicology
 Charles Norris (Royal Navy officer) (1900–1989)
 Charles Norris (artist) (1909–2004), British stained-glass artist
 Charlie Norris (born 1965), retired American professional wrestler
 Charlie Norris (footballer) (1881–1940), Australian rules footballer

See also
 Charles Norris-Newman (1852–1920), British journalist, adventurer and intelligence officer
 Chuck Norris (born 1940), Carlos Ray Norris, actor and martial artist
 Chuck Norris (politician) (Charles Reed Norris, 1925–2009), American politician
 Chuck Norris (musician) (Charles Eldridge Norris, 1921–1989), American jazz and blues guitarist